The Loving/Wayne WR-1 Love is a single seat, midget racer built in the 1950s.

Design and development
The WR-1 is a single place, gull-winged aircraft with conventional landing gear.  The fuselage uses wood truss construction with aircraft fabric covering. The all-wood, plywood covered gull-wing features faired, fixed landing gear at the lowest point. The design was submitted and approved by the professional racing pilots association in 1948 with construction starting in January 1949.

Operational history
In the 1951 National Air Races pilot Neal Vernon Loving qualified with a  dive. The aircraft's spinner separated, damaging the propeller.

In December 1953, Loving flew the WR-1 2200 miles from Detroit to Kingston, Jamaica, an unusually long trip for a new experimental design of the era.

In 1954, the design was the winner of the Most Outstanding Design award at the Experimental Aircraft Association Fly-in at Rockford, Illinois.

Specifications (WR-1)

References

External links

 Neal Loving Interview

Homebuilt aircraft
Racing aircraft
Inverted gull-wing aircraft
Single-engined tractor aircraft
Aircraft first flown in 1950